Duritropis is a genus of minute, salt-tolerant snails with an operculum, aquatic gastropod mollusks, or micromollusks, in the subfamily Omphalotropidinae  of the family Assimineidae.

Species
 Duritropis albocarinata (Mousson, 1873)
Synonyms
 Duritropis brenchleyi (Sykes, 1900): synonym of Duritropis albocarinata (Mousson, 1873) (junior synonym)
 Duritropis fortilirata Iredale, 1945: synonym of Duritropis albocarinata (Mousson, 1873) (junior synonym)

References

Assimineidae
Gastropod genera